Aerides lawrenceae is a species of plant in the family Orchidaceae. It is endemic to the Philippines.  Its natural habitat is subtropical or tropical moist lowland forests. It is threatened by habitat loss and overcollection.

Description
Growing in brightly lit environments at low altitude on the islands of Mindanao and Cebu, Aerides lawrenciae is a robust species up to 5 ft (1.5 meters) tall. It sometimes becomes pendulous. The inflorescence has up to 30 strongly fragrant flowers, each about 4 cm across. Flowering occurs during autumn.

References

External links
 
 

lawrenciae
Endemic orchids of the Philippines
Flora of the Visayas
Flora of Mindanao
Endangered flora of Asia
Taxonomy articles created by Polbot
Taxobox binomials not recognized by IUCN